Dalma Iványi (born March 18, 1976) is a Hungarian basketball player and coach, who played as a guard. She won 10 Nemzeti Bajnokság I/A Championships with Mizo Pécs 2010 and PINKK-Pécsi 424. She also played for Utah Starzz, Phoenix Mercury, and San Antonio Silver Stars in the American Women's National Basketball Association. Iványi is the current coach of Hungarian club .

Personal life
Iványi was born on March 18, 1976, in Békéscsaba, Hungarian People's Republic (now Hungary). She started playing basketball at the age of 5 in Mezőberény. Her husband is Bulgarian, and they have two children.

Club career
Iványi played as a guard. Iványi started out as a youth player at Pécs 2010 (PVSK), the women's basketball team in Pécs, Hungary. She was a captain of the youth team, before being promoted to the senior team in 1994. In the final game of her first season, Iványi scored 22 points, as PVSK won the Nemzeti Bajnokság I/A. She also played for PINKK-Pécsi 424. During her career, Iványi won 10 Hungarian Championships, including nine with Pécs 2010 between 1994 and 2011.

In the US, Iványi played college basketball for Florida International University (FIU), before graduating from FIU in 1999. She played for four years at FIU, and averaged 14.1 points, 4.8 rebounds, 8.5 assists and 3.6 steals per game. In her sophomore year, Iványi was one of seven non-American players in the FIU team. In the 1997 season, Iványi had the most assists in the league.

Iványi was drafted by the Utah Starzz in the fourth round of the 1999 Women's National Basketball Association draft. Fellow Hungarian Andrea Nagy was also drafted, and Iványi was one of 12 college basketball players selected in the draft. Iványi played in the WNBA between 1999 and 2006. Between 1999 and 2000 she played for the Utah Starzz, and she did not play in the WNBA in the 2001 season, due to her commitments in the Hungarian league. In 2003, she played for Phoenix Mercury, and from 2004 to 2006 she played for San Antonio Silver Stars. Whilst with the Stars, she shared a car with Polish player Agnieszka Bibrzycka.

International career
Iványi played internationally for Hungary over 130 times. She represented them in four EuroBasket Women tournaments, and one FIBA Women's Basketball World Cup, winning two EuroBasket bronze medals.

Coaching career
After retiring, Iványi became youth coach of PINKK-Pécsi 424. From 2019 to 2020, she coached the PINKK-Pécsi 424 senior team.

Notes

References

External links
 WNBA profile

1976 births
Living people
FIU Panthers women's basketball players
Guards (basketball)
Hungarian women's basketball coaches
Hungarian women's basketball players
Phoenix Mercury players
San Antonio Stars players
Utah Starzz players
20th-century Hungarian women
21st-century Hungarian women
People from Békéscsaba
Sportspeople from Békés County